Chris Reis (born September 19, 1983) played as an American football safety for the New Orleans Saints of the National Football League. He was signed by the Atlanta Falcons as an undrafted free agent in 2006. He played college football at Georgia Tech and played high school football for Roswell High School. In 2007, he also played in the NFL Europe as Safety for the Cologne Centurions where he was named to the 2007 NFL Europe All-World Team.

Reis played a central role in a crucial play during Super Bowl XLIV. With the Saints trailing the Indianapolis Colts 10-6 at the beginning of the second half, Saints head coach Sean Payton unexpectedly called for an onside kick by rookie punter and kickoff specialist Thomas Morstead.  The kick bounced off the Colts' Hank Baskett, and a fierce battle for the ball ensued.  The officials eventually ruled that the Saints had recovered the ball: although Jonathan Casillas was officially credited with the recovery, Casillas and other Saints players said it was actually Reis who did so.  The play was considered a key turning point in the Saints' eventual 31-17 win.

Reis suffered a shoulder injury in Week 4 of the 2010 season and was put on IR afterwards. Reis was cut from the New Orleans Saints on September 3, 2011

Reis is a Christian. who pastors at Our Saviors Church Lafayette campus in Louisiana.

References

External links
Official Website
New Orleans Saints bio
Georgia Tech Yellow Jackets bio

1983 births
Living people
People from Roswell, Georgia
Players of American football from Georgia (U.S. state)
American football defensive backs
Georgia Tech Yellow Jackets football players
Cologne Centurions (NFL Europe) players
Atlanta Falcons players
New Orleans Saints players
Players of American football from Canton, Ohio
Sportspeople from Fulton County, Georgia